Michael Anthony Jackson (born March 27, 1954) is an American convicted murderer who was sentenced to death in 1984 for shooting and killing police officer Ken Wrede in West Covina, California in August 1983. He is currently incarcerated in San Quentin State Prison.

Murder of Officer Ken Wrede 
Shortly after noon on August 31, 1983, West Covina Police Officer, 26-year-old Ken Wrede, responded to calls of an intoxicated man walking barefoot and disturbing residents. Wrede approached the man, who identified as 29-year-old Michael Anthony Jackson. Wrede attempted to handcuff Jackson until Jackson lunged at him. Jackson obtained a shotgun from Wrede’s patrol car and shot the officer multiple times, but before being shot Wrede radioed for help, but by the time other officers arrived, Wrede was already dead, and the officers detained Jackson. Jackson was arrested and admitted to taking PCP-laced cigarettes earlier that day.

Conviction 
During the trial, Jackson's lawyers argued that he might have been severely high, which made him not legally responsible for the murder. On May 21, 1984, Jackson was found guilty of first-degree murder and sentenced to death. Jackson still had some supporters who believed that he was not in his right state of mind when killing Wrede and that it would be cruel to him. On May 9, 2000, with Jackson's execution date approaching, the federal court of appeals concluded that if all available evidence had been presented during the trial's penalty phase, there was a reasonable chance that he might have received a sentence of life imprisonment. In a court hearing, judges criticized Jackson's lawyers for not mentioning that Jackson had been once diagnosed as Schizophrenic, that the dose of PCP might render him legally not responsible for the killing. Nevertheless, Jackson stayed on death row.

Since 2006, California has not executed a death row prisoner. Jackson, now 68 years old as of 2022, will likely not be executed.

See also 
List of death row inmates in the United States

References 

Living people
1983 murders in the United States
20th-century American criminals
American male criminals
American people convicted of drug offenses
American people convicted of murder
People convicted of murder by California
Prisoners sentenced to death by California
Criminals from California
20th-century African-American people
1954 births